The 1954 Titleholders Championship was contested from March 11–14 at Augusta Country Club. It was the 15th edition of the Titleholders Championship.

This event was won by Louise Suggs.

Final leaderboard

External links
The News and Courier source

Titleholders Championship
Golf in Georgia (U.S. state)
Titleholders Championship
Titleholders Championship
Titleholders Championship
Titleholders Championship
Women's sports in Georgia (U.S. state)